Patrick Toelen (born 17 December 1962) is a Belgian former professional racing cyclist. He rode in the 1985 Tour de France. Toelen rode for the teams Hitachi Sunair - Splendor and Hitachi Marc.

References

External links
 

1962 births
Living people
Belgian male cyclists
People from Geel
Cyclists from Antwerp Province